Michael Philip Carew (born 10 February 1966 in Trinidad) is a retired professional cricketer who played first-class and List A cricket for Trinidad and Tobago. He is the son of the former West Indies Test player Joey Carew.

References

External links

Trinidad and Tobago cricketers
Living people
1966 births
21st-century Trinidad and Tobago people